The Saint Vincent and the Grenadines competed at the 2011 Pan American Games in Guadalajara, Mexico from October 14 to 30, 2011. The Saint Vincent and the Grenadines team  consisted of four athletes in three sports.

Athletics

The Saint Vincent and the Grenadines sent two athletes.

Men
Track and road events

Women
Track and road events

Cycling

The Saint Vincent and the Grenadines sent one cyclist who competed in road cycling.

Road 
Men

Swimming

The Saint Vincent and the Grenadines sent one swimmer.

Men

References

Nations at the 2011 Pan American Games
P
2011